Mouna Jlezi (born 22 June 1991) is a Tunisian handball player for Romanian club HCM Slobozia and the Tunisian national team.

She participated at the 2015 World Women's Handball Championship.

References

1991 births
Living people
Tunisian female handball players
Expatriate handball players
Tunisian expatriate sportspeople in Romania